Pierre Fournier (born 16 July 1952) is a French comics writer and comics artist, working under the pen name Makyo. He is best known as the initial author of the series Jérôme K. Jérôme Bloche and La Balade au Bout du monde.

References

 

 Pierre Fournier on Lambiek's Comiclopedia

1952 births
Living people
French comics artists
French comics writers
French male writers